2018 Albirex Niigata season.

J2 League

References

External links
 J.League official site

Albirex Niigata
Albirex Niigata seasons